Tayo, also known as "patois de Saint-Louis", is a French-based Creole spoken in New Caledonia. The language developed out of the contact of speakers of many different Kanak languages in the mission, and the use of French for official purposes and as the language of prestige. The language contains structural elements primarily from Melanesian languages and lexical elements mainly from French.

History 

Saint-Louis was founded as a Marist mission in 1860 in the early French colonial period of the island, in order to convert the native Kanak population to Christianity and a European way of life. The missionaries took converts from surrounding Kanak tribes, especially the Cèmuhi, Drubea and Xârâcuu to live in the mission. Saint-Louis therefore became a highly multilingual society with a diverse range of Kanak languages as well as French. In order for different ethnic groups to communicate and also because French was the language imposed by the missionaries, a simplified French became the language of communication and the native language of the next generation, which developed into Tayo Creole, mixing French vocabulary with mainly Melanesian language structures.

The Role of the Girls' Mission School 
The girls school in Saint-Louis has been widely considered instrumental in creating the conditions for the formation of Tayo, especially by Speedy (2013). There, Kanak girls were schooled in standard French, and Kanak languages were forbidden, although in practice girls used many linguistic resources to communicate such as code-switching, translation and the use of interlanguages. These communicative practices resulted in a form of French with Melanesian structures. Men and boys meanwhile had less exposure to French working in the field. When the girls married husbands from the community their language had greater prestige than Kanak languages, thanks to the ideology of the missionaries. Therefore, despite the societal multilingualism that had been the norm in New Caledonia at the time, in which children would learn the different native languages of their mother and father, couples communicated with each other and their children primarily in simplified French and this became the first language of the next generation, as Tayo Creole.

The impact of Reunion Creole 
There has been a debate among linguists as to the impact of Reunion Creole in the formation of Tayo. Chaudenson proposed that Tayo was actually a ‘second generation’ creole, directly descended from the creole language of Reunionese migrants. He based this claim on phonological, lexical and grammatical similarities between the languages and the fact that some Reunionese had settled near Saint-Louis. Ehrhart and Corne refuted this claim, arguing that Tayo contains mainly Kanak structures. Speedy agrees that Tayo is largely structurally Melanesian, although she also argues that Reunion Creole was a type of French that interacted in the formation of Tayo.

Phonology

Grammar

Nouns 
Tayo nouns do not display much internal morphology, with some number and definiteness information encoded in modifiers and clitics outside of the noun.

Pluralisation 
This is placed before the noun as shown in example (a):

(a)  

PL	nun-the/this		SI	work

“The/these nuns work”

Determiner/Demonstrative 
Another nominal modifier is the clitic -la which can optionally follow nouns to introduce something new or to point to something within reach. This modifier, also present in New Caledonian French, occurs frequently, especially with English loanwords and monosyllabic words. This is demonstrated in example (b):

(b)	ma	uver	kapoa-la

I	open	tin-the/this

“I open the/this tin”

Possession 
Possession is denoted with the preposition pu, placed after the possessed and before the possessor. This is shown in example (c):

(c)	fij		pu	ʃef

daughter	PREP	chief

“The chief’s daughter”

Personal Pronouns 

Personal pronouns are divided into two categories, characterised by Ehrhart and Revis (2013) as dependent pronouns and independent pronouns. The dependent pronouns denote the subject of a clause, and the independent pronouns denote a range of functions including the object, emphatic subject, reflexive subject or possessor. In the dual and 1st and 2nd person plural, both types of pronoun have the same form. Example (d) below shows the dependent pronoun sa in subject position and the independent pronoun mwa as a direct object. Meanwhile, example (e) shows the independent pronoun lja as an indirect object, as it is after the preposition ave.

(d)	sa 	wa 	mwa

they	see	me

“They see me”

(e)	nu	tro	aːᵐbete	ave	lja		depi	taler

we	too	annoyed	with	him/her	since	just.now

“We too are annoyed with him since just now”

Independent pronouns can also function as emphatic subjects. In these cases, the dependent pronoun functions like a clitic, characterised by Ehrart and Revis (2013) as a subject index. This is shown in example (f):

(f)	mwa	ma 	malad

I	I (SI)	sick

“I (emphatic) am sick”

A final use for independent pronouns is in possessive constructions. These are identical to how possession is expressed with nouns, with the independent pronoun placed after the possessive preposition pu, as shown in example (g):

(g)	kas	pu	mwa

house	PREP	me

“My house” (Ehrhart & Revis 2013)

Verbs

Tense, Aspect and Modality 
Tense and aspect, and modality are encoded in markers preceding the verb, as shown in the table below:

Negation 
The particle pa is placed before the verb to express negation, in contrast to the French source word pas, which follows the verb. This is shown in example (h):

(h)	ma	pa	ule

I	NEG	want

“I do not like to”

Imperatives 
Imperative verbs are formed with an unmodified verb base, as in example (i):

(i)	ndesa		nde	lao,	twa

come.down	from	up	you

“Come down from up there, you!”

Causatives 
The marker fe is said before a verb to denote a causative action, as in example (j):

(j)	la	fe	plan	ver-la

s/he	make	full	glass-the/this

“He filled the glass”

Questions 
Polar questions are formed the same way like a statement, but with rising intonation, like is often done in spoken French. This is shown in example (k):

(k)	ta	kone	ke	se	mama		pu	lja?

you	know	that	PRESV	mother	POSS	him/her

“Do you know that she is his/her mother?”

Content questions likewise are phrased like statements, except with an interrogative pronoun in place of a noun phrase, shown in example (l):

(l)	ta	war	ki?

you	see	who

“Who did you see?”

Structural Formation 
Siegel's (2008) analysis of tense, mood and aspect marking in Kanak substrate languages and Tayo Creole supports the theory that structural features from substrate languages (i.e. in this case, the Kanak languages) are mostly likely to transfer into the creole when they are shared by most of the substrate languages, and the lexifier language (i.e. in this case, French). For example, future tense was marked in two out of three languages analysed as a pre-verbal tense marker. French also frequently express future tense using the verb aller (‘go’), as a pre-verbal marker. As this verb is most often realised in the 3rd person singular form va, this form was transferred into Tayo Creole as the future tense marker. Likewise, progressive aspect marking occurs in all three languages, and French uses the phrase en train de with a similar function in pre-verbal position. As such, atra nde was transferred into the creole language as a pre-verbal progressive marker.

Sociolinguistic situation 
Tayo is in a diglossic relationship with French, with French having higher prestige and used in institutions such as education and in jobs, and Tayo mainly relegated to private homes. Tayo is often denigrated as ‘bad French’, with a Tayo speaking woman stating that as a child she was forbidden from speaking Tayo. A survey conducted by Bissonauth & Parish found that out of eight respondents who reported understanding Tayo, only three reported using it regularly.

References

French-based pidgins and creoles
Romance languages in Oceania